Racha Riabi is a Tunisian footballer who plays as a defender. She has been a member of the Tunisia women's national team.

Club career
Riabi has played for Tunis Air Club in Tunisia.

International career
Riabi capped for Tunisia at senior level during 2016 Africa Women Cup of Nations qualification.

See also
List of Tunisia women's international footballers

References

External links

Living people
Tunisian women's footballers
Women's association football defenders
Tunisia women's international footballers
Year of birth missing (living people)